Indiana Dunes National Park is a National Park Service unit on the shore of Lake Michigan in Indiana, United States. A BioBlitz took place there on May 15 and 16, 2009. A first attempt was made to create a list of crustaceans present in the Lakeshore area. Further research is required to document all that may be present.

Branchiopoda
Cladocera, water fleas 
 Alona costata
 Bosmina longirostris
 Ceriadaphnia reticulata
 Daphnia laevis
 Macrothrix rosea
 Alonella, Family Chydoridae 
 Ceriodaphnia, Family Daphniidae
 Daphnia, Family Daphniidae

Maxillopoda
Copepods 
 Canthocamptus assimilis
 Diaptomus leptapus
 Eucyclops agilis
 Thermocyclops dybowskii
 Paracyclops fimbriatus
 nauplii

Ostracoda
 Notodromas monacha

Malacostraca
 Isopoda, woodlice and/or pill bug species
 Porcellio scaber, woodlouse
 Orconectes immunis, crayfish

References 

Crustaceans
Indiana Dunes